The 2006–07 film awards season began in November 2006 and ended in February 2007.

Ballots were sent out begging from November.

Awards ceremonies

See also 
 Film awards seasons

Footnotes

2006 film awards